was a Japanese author and poet.

Biography
Ozaki was the only son of Kokusai, a well-known  carver in the Meiji period. Ozaki is known as a classic Japanese author writing works in essays,  haiku poems, and novels. He grew up in his hometown of Shibachumonmae, located in what is now part of Tokyo, until the age of four, when his mother died. The death of his mother lead him to live with his grandparents in Shibashinmei-cho.  His childhood there influenced him in his choice of the penname Koyo, from Mount Koyo of Zojo Temple.

Ozaki was educated at Baisen Primary School before entering the Highschool of Tokyofu Daini Junior High School, later dropping out after two years. After he entered the Mita English School. Eventually, he enrolled at the Tokyo Imperial University. There he started publishing a literary magazine called  ("Friend of the Ink Stone") in 1885 with some friends. Well-known writers Yamada Bimyō and Kawakami Bizan also had material published in the magazine.

His most notable pupils were Izumi Kyōka, a romance author who specialized in short stories and who continued to write in Ozaki's style, and author Tokuda Shūsei. 

 was adapted for film numerous times, including a 1937 version by director Hiroshi Shimizu.

See also
 Japanese literature
 List of Japanese authors

References

External links

Ancestral Research on Ozaki Kōyō (Mainly in Japanese)

1868 births
1903 deaths
19th-century Japanese novelists
People from Tokyo
19th-century Japanese poets
Japanese haiku poets